Czesław Cyraniak (1 June 1914 – 11 September 1939) was a Polish boxer who competed in the 1936 Summer Olympics. Born in Poznań, in 1936 he was eliminated in the second round of the lightweight class after losing his fight to José Padilla. Cyraniak fought in the Polish Army in the September Campaign and died in the Battle of Bzura.

References

External links
 profile

1914 births
1939 deaths
Lightweight boxers
Olympic boxers of Poland
Boxers at the 1936 Summer Olympics
Polish military personnel killed in World War II
Sportspeople from Poznań
Polish male boxers
20th-century Polish people